Verano Brianza (Milanese: Veran) is a comune (municipality) in the Province of Monza and Brianza in the Italian region Lombardy, located about  north of Milan.

Verano Brianza borders the following municipalities: Briosco, Giussano, Carate Brianza.

Notable people from Verano Brianza
Cesare Cattaneo, football player
Paolo Nespoli, astronaut
Rita Piacenza, wife of American artist Thomas Hart Benton.
Alessandro Scanziani, football player and coach

Demographic evolution

Gallery

References